Pancalia gaedikei is a moth in the family Cosmopterigidae. It is found in Khabarovsk Krai, Russia.

References

Moths described in 1985
Antequerinae